Benjamin Prichard or Pritchard may refer to:

Benjamin Prichard, an early American industrialist who founded the Amoskeag Mills in New Hampshire
Benjamin Pritchard (rower), British para-rower
Benjamin D. Pritchard, a U.S. Army officer
Benjamin Prichard's Tennessee Whiskey, named after a 19th-century Tennessee distiller.